This is the timeline of modern antimicrobial (anti-infective) therapy.
The years show when a given drug was released onto the pharmaceutical
market. This is not a timeline of the development of the antibiotics themselves.

 1911 – Arsphenamine a.k.a. Salvarsan
 1912 – Neosalvarsan
 1935 – Prontosil (an oral precursor to sulfanilamide), the first sulfonamide
 1936 – Sulfanilamide
 1938 – Sulfapyridine (M&B 693)
 1939 – sulfacetamide
 1940 – sulfamethizole
 1942 – benzylpenicillin, the first penicillin
 1942 – gramicidin S, the first peptide antibiotic
 1942 – sulfadimidine
 1943 – sulfamerazine
 1944 – streptomycin, the first aminoglycoside
 1947 – sulfadiazine
 1948 – chlortetracycline, the first tetracycline
 1949 – chloramphenicol, the first amphenicol 
 1949 – neomycin
 1950 – oxytetracycline
 1950 – penicillin G procaine
 1952 – erythromycin, the first macrolide
 1954 – benzathine penicillin
 1955 – spiramycin
 1955 – tetracycline
 1955 – thiamphenicol
 1955 – vancomycin, the first glycopeptide
 1956 – phenoxymethylpenicillin
 1958 – colistin, the first polymyxin
 1958 – demeclocycline
 1959 – virginiamycin
 1960 – methicillin
 1960 – metronidazole, the first nitroimidazole
 1961 – ampicillin
 1961 – spectinomycin
 1961 – sulfamethoxazole
 1961 – trimethoprim, the first dihydrofolate reductase inhibitor
 1962 – oxacillin
 1962 – cloxacillin
 1962 – fusidic acid
 1963 – fusafungine
 1963 – lymecycline
 1964 – gentamicin
 1964 – cefalotin, the first cephalosporin
 1966 – doxycycline
 1967 – carbenicillin
 1967 – rifampicin
 1967 – nalidixic acid, the first quinolone
 1968 – clindamycin, the second lincosamide
 1970 – cefalexin
 1971 – cefazolin
 1971 – pivampicillin
 1971 – tinidazole
 1972 – amoxicillin
 1972 – cefradine
 1972 – minocycline
 1972 – pristinamycin
 1973 – fosfomycin
 1974 – talampicillin
 1975 – tobramycin
 1975 – bacampicillin
 1975 – ticarcillin
 1976 – amikacin
 1977 – azlocillin
 1977 – cefadroxil
 1977 – cefamandole
 1977 – cefoxitin
 1977 – cefuroxime
 1977 – mezlocillin
 1977 – pivmecillinam

From 1978

 1979 – cefaclor
 1980 – cefmetazole
 1980 – cefotaxime
 1980 – piperacillin
 1981 – co-amoxiclav (amoxicillin/clavulanic acid)
 1981 – cefoperazone
 1981 – cefotiam
 1981 – cefsulodin
 1981 – latamoxef
 1981 – netilmicin
 1982 – ceftriaxone
 1982 – micronomicin
 1983 – cefmenoxime
 1983 – ceftazidime
 1983 – ceftizoxime
 1983 – norfloxacin
 1984 – cefonicid
 1984 – cefotetan
 1984 – temocillin
 1985 – cefpiramide
 1985 – imipenem/cilastatin, the first carbapenem
 1985 – ofloxacin
 1986 – mupirocin
 1986 – aztreonam
 1986 – cefoperazone/sulbactam
 1986 – co-ticarclav (ticarcillin/clavulanic acid)
 1987 – ampicillin/sulbactam
 1987 – cefixime
 1987 – roxithromycin
 1987 – sultamicillin
 1987 – ciprofloxacin, the first 2nd-gen fluoroquinolone  
 1987 – rifaximin, the first ansamycin
 1988 – azithromycin 
 1988 – flomoxef
 1988 – isepamycin
 1988 – midecamycin
 1988 – rifapentine
 1988 – teicoplanin
 1989 – cefpodoxime
 1989 – enrofloxacin
 1989 – lomefloxacin
 1989 – moxifloxacin
 1990 – arbekacin
 1990 – cefodizime
 1990 – clarithromycin
 1991 – cefdinir
 1992 – cefetamet
 1992 – cefpirome
 1992 – cefprozil
 1992 – ceftibuten
 1992 – fleroxacin
 1992 – loracarbef
 1992 – piperacillin/tazobactam
 1992 – rufloxacin
 1993 – brodimoprim
 1993 – dirithromycin
 1993 – levofloxacin
 1993 – nadifloxacin
 1993 – panipenem/betamipron
 1993 – sparfloxacin
 1994 – cefepime
 1996 – meropenem
 1999 – quinupristin/dalfopristin
 2000 – linezolid, the first oxazolidinone
 2001 – telithromycin, the first ketolide
 2003 – daptomycin
 2005 – tigecycline, the first glycylcycline
 2005 – doripenem
 2009 – telavancin, the first Lipoglycopeptide
 2010 – ceftaroline
 2011 – fidaxomicin
 2012 – bedaquiline
 2013 – telavancin
 2014 – tedizolid
 2014 – dalbavancin
 2014 – ceftolozane/tazobactam
 2015 – ceftazidime/avibactam
 2017 - meropenem/vaborbactam
 2019 - imipenem/cilastatin/relebactam
 2019 - cefiderocol

See also
 Timeline of medicine and medical technology
 List of antibiotics, grouped by class

References

Antibiotics
Antibiotics
History of pharmacy
Antibiotics, timeline